State Route 122 (SR 122) is a  state highway in Coffee County in the southern part of the U.S. state of Alabama. The western terminus of the highway is at an intersection with U.S. Route 84 (US 84) at New Brockton. The eastern terminus of the highway is at an intersection with SR 51 north of Enterprise.

Route description
SR 122 begins at an intersection with US 84 (internally designated as SR 12) in New Brockton. It heads northwest on two-lane undivided McKinnon Street. The highway heads through rural areas before passing homes. In the center of New Brockton, the highway turns northeast onto North John Street and continues past more residences. Upon leaving New Brockton, SR 122 heads into a mix of farmland and woodland as an unnamed road. The highway turns more to the east before it reaches its eastern terminus, an intersection with SR 51.

Major intersections

See also

References

External links

122
Transportation in Coffee County, Alabama